Emergency Medicine Australasia (until 2005, Emergency Medicine) is a bimonthly peer-reviewed medical journal covering emergency medicine. It is published by Wiley-Blackwell. It is the official journal of the Australasian College for Emergency Medicine and the Australasian Society for Emergency Medicine. The founding editor was George Jelinek and the current editor-in-chief is Geoff Hughes. According to the Journal Citation Reports, the journal has a 2017 impact factor of 1.353.

References

External links

Australasian College for Emergency Medicine
Australasian Society for Emergency Medicine

English-language journals
Wiley-Blackwell academic journals
Emergency medicine journals
Publications established in 1991
Bimonthly journals